The 2022 European Men's Handball Championship qualification was a handball competition organized by the European Handball Federation (EHF) to determine 20 of the 24 men's national teams competing in the 2022 European Men's Handball Championship final tournament. They joined the other four teams already qualified: Hungary and Slovakia, as final tournament co-hosts, and Spain and Croatia, who finished in the top two positions in the previous championship. 

This qualification competition was being disputed by a total of 40 national teams in three phases between January 2019 and May 2021.

Qualification system
The campaign was split into two distinct qualification phases and a relegation round. 

Qualification phase 1 comprises teams which didn't participate at the 2020 EHF Euro qualification Phase 2. The two best teams advanced to the relegation round.

In the relegation round, the two teams that advanced from phase 1 were joined by the highest ranked European team at the 2019 IHF Emerging Nations Championship and they faced the three lowest ranked fourth-placed teams from the 2020 EHF Euro qualification. Three winners of those elimination matches advanced to the qualification phase 2.

Qualification phase 2 comprised three winners from the relegation round along with 29 teams which participated at either the 2020 EHF Euro or the qualification phase 2.

Qualification Phase 1

Seeding
The draw for the qualification round 1 was held on 28 September 2018 in Vienna, Austria. This qualification was played in a tournament format, with the teams able to choose whether they wanted to play on 4 to 6 January or 11 to 13 January 2019.

Groups

Group A

Group B

IHF Emerging Nations Championship

Unlike previous editions, single participation at this tournament was not possible. Only teams participating at the qualification phase 1 and failing to advance, earned a right to play. The best ranked European team qualified for the relegation round.

Note: Ranking of exclusively European teams is displayed.

Relegation from the previous qualification cycle

The three lowest ranked among fourth-placed teams in the 2020 European Men's Handball Championship qualification, apart from Slovakia as co-host nation, played in the relegation round. The other four teams entered qualification phase 2.

Relegation round

Seeding
The draw for EHF EURO 2022 Relegation Round took place at the EHF Office on 23 July 2019. Three lowest ranked sides from EHF EURO 2020 Qualification Phase 2 were seeded teams while qualification phase 1 participants were unseeded teams.

Overview
The first legs were played on 15 and 16 January and the second legs on 19 January 2020.

|}

Matches

Finland won 61–45 on aggregate.

Estonia won 69–53 on aggregate.

Belgium won 55–23 on aggregate.

Qualification Phase 2
In this round, pre-qualified teams from the EHF EURO 2020 qualification and final tournaments joined the three winners from the relegation round. The 32 teams were split into eight groups of four, with the winners and runners-up qualifying for the final tournament, together with the four best third-placed teams.

The draw was initially scheduled to take place at the EHF Executive Committee meeting in Bratislava on 23 April 2020.
On 13 March 2020, the EHF announced that the draw would be postponed due to the COVID-19 pandemic across Europe, with the new date set for 16 June 2020.

Seeding
On 2 June 2020, the EHF revealed the seeding pots and the draw procedure. The 32 teams qualified for this stage were seeded in four pots, according to the EHF men's national team ranking. The draw allocated successively the eight teams from Pot 3, followed by the eight teams from Pot 2, Pot 1 and finally Pot 4. For political reasons, Kosovo (Pot 4) was drawn to a group not containing Serbia (Pot 2).

All times are local.

Group 1

Group 2

Group 3

Group 4

Group 5

Group 6

Group 7

Group 8

Ranking of third-placed teams
The four highest ranked third-placed teams from the groups directly qualified for the tournament. Matches against the fourth-placed teams in each group were discarded.

Ranking of fourth-placed teams
The four lowest ranked third-placed teams from the groups will play the Relegation round of the EURO 2024 qualification. Other teams will enter Qualifiers.

Notes

References

External links
Official website

Qualification
European Men's Championship qualification
European Men's Championship qualification
European Men's Championship qualification
Qualification for handball competitions
European Men's Handball Championship qualification, 2022